Peter in Magicland: A Fantastic Journey is a 1990 German animated children's fantasy film, based on Gerdt von Bassewitz's 1915 book Little Peter's Journey to the Moon. The film was released on 29 November 1990 in Germany.

Plot
One night, siblings Peter and Annabelle are woken up by a noise in their bedroom that sounds like music. Upon investigating, they find the source: a beetle playing on his violin. The beetle introduces himself as Mr. Buzzworthy, the 5th descendant from the generations of Buzzworthys, who then tells them his tragic story: two hundred years ago, on a Sunday morning, his great-great-great-grandfather was resting on a birch, when an evil woodcutter chopped the tree down and took it away, also taking the beetle's sixth leg (lower left arm) with him; as a consequence, all of the generations were born only with five legs. Shortly after, the beetle is visited by a Night Fairy, who tells him that she punished the woodcutter by banishing him to the Moon along with the tree, thus becoming Moon Man. When the beetle realizes that his leg is missing, the Fairy advises him to search for two kind children who never hurt a bug and are brave enough for a dangerous journey to the Moon.

Upon hearing the story, the children agree to help him retrieve his leg. After teaching the children how to fly and receiving an approval from three official beetles, they set off towards the sky. After evading some of the mischievous Weather Makers, they reach Sandman, a wizard whose job is to make children fall asleep. Explaining the situation to him, he agrees to take them to the Night Fairy's castle in a sleigh pulled by butterflies. After evading the Makers again and getting their sleigh unstuck while on Milky Way, they finally reach the castle, where a banquet among the Makers is taking place. Reminding the Fairy of her promise, she gives them a Giant Polar Bear to help them get to the Moon, telling them that the Makers will help them in their journey only when they show true courage against any danger.

Reaching the Moon, they go through the Christmas and Easter worlds to find some snack for the Bear, before continuing on their journey. After fending off some hostile wolves, they arrive at a cannon which shoots Peter, Annabelle and Mr. Buzzworthy to the top of the mountain, where the tree with the beetle's leg stands. They encounter the Moon Man himself, and the Makers come to the children's aid, eventually defeating him by freezing him. Peter removes the leg from the tree and attaches it back to Mr. Buzzworthy, who is now overjoyed at having his long-lost leg back. When the sun rises, the ice from the Moon Man melts and he tries to attack them, but they escape him by flying into a chimney that wakes them up, revealing it all to be a dream. After their mother checks on them (who looks similar to the Night Fairy), they find a beetle resting on their windowsill, who has all of his six legs. The beetle then flies away, while Peter and Annabelle wonder if they will ever fly with him again.

Cast

Release
An 80-minute cut of the film was initially widely released as a full-length feature and a five-part miniseries. The uncut version first aired in December 1992 on ZDF.

References

External links
 
 

1990 animated films
1990 films
1990s children's adventure films
1990s children's fantasy films
1990s German films
1990s German-language films
Animated films about bears
Animated films about insects
Animated films about siblings
Animated films about wolves
Animated films based on children's books
Films about fairies and sprites
Films about giants
Films about polar bears
Films about wizards
Films scored by Klaus Doldinger
German animated fantasy films
German children's adventure films
German children's fantasy films
Moon in film